Mwene-Ditu is a town in southern Democratic Republic of the Congo, Lomami Province.

History
The town of Mwene Ditu is born of the Presidential Order Act No. 43/2003 of 28 March 2003 on a proposal and request of a national adviser on defense and security during the transition from the Global and Inclusive Agreement signed SUN CITY, South Africa during 2003.

Its importance stems from its strategic position on the rich and not developed areas of green pastures and agro-pastoral, including the proximity to the city of Mbuji-Mayi, capital of the province of Kasai Oriental, located 126 km Mwene-Ditu north. Everything passes through Mwene-Ditu.

Transport
It is served by a station on the national railway system.

Mwene-Ditu Airport is located in the northwestern part of the city.

Mwene-Ditu lies along National Road 1 (N1) and is the terminus of National Road 40 (N40)

See also
AS Makinku

References

Populated places in Lomami
2003 establishments in the Democratic Republic of the Congo